Mala B. Rao  is a British Indian physician who is a senior clinical fellow in the department of primary care at Imperial College London. She serves as a medical adviser to NHS England and a vice chair of WaterAid. Her research investigates the impact of climate change and eco-anxiety on public health.

Early life and education 
Rao was born in India. She decided to become a doctor as a child and studied medicine in Delhi. At the time, the world was fighting to eradicate smallpox, and Rao decided she would specialise in public health. She was a postgraduate student at the University of London, where she completed a National Health Service (NHS) training programme at the London School of Hygiene and Tropical Medicine.

Research and career 
Rao remained in the United Kingdom, where she became a consultant in public health. She served as Director of Public Health, and developed a public health practise that involved audit and development. She established the UK's first evidenced-based network to assess cancer. In the late 1980s, Rao became concerned about the impact of climate change on human health. Rao returned to India, where she spent six years working on public health campaigns to improve medical provision for the poor.

Rao has campaigned to raise awareness about the impact of climate change and eco-anxiety on patients health and mental health. To this end, she has served on various government task forces, and delivered several public lectures. She wrote The Health Practitioner’s Guide to Climate Change, which was highly commended in the British Medical Association public health awards. 

In 2014, Rao launched an investigation into the wellbeing of black and minority ethnic populations in England. She established the Imperial College London ethnicity and health unit, where she investigated health inequalities in the NHS workforce, in the general population and in health research.

In 2004, Rao was appointed head of the england public health workforce and led the London Department of Health. She was appointed a medical adviser to NHS England's Workforce Race Equality Strategy between 2018 and 2022.

Awards and honours 
Rao's awards and honours include:

 2013 Appointed Order of the British Empire (OBE) in the 2013 New Year Honours for "services to Public Health in the UK and Overseas".
 2021 Awarded the Alwyn Smith Prize by the Faculty of Public Health (FPH)
 2022 Elected an honorary member of the Royal College of Paediatrics and Child Health (RCPCH)

Selected publications 
Rao's publications include:
 Molecular and biotechnological aspects of microbial proteases
 Molecular and biotechnological aspects of xylanases
 Molecular and industrial aspects of glucose isomerase

References 

Year of birth missing (living people)
Living people
People from Chennai
Indian emigrants to the United Kingdom
20th-century British medical doctors
20th-century women physicians
21st-century British medical doctors
21st-century women physicians
Officers of the Order of the British Empire
Delhi University alumni
Alumni of the London School of Hygiene & Tropical Medicine
Academics of Imperial College London
Medical doctors from Tamil Nadu